The Most Beautiful Couple in the World (Italian: La più bella coppia del mondo) is a 1968 Italian "musicarello" comedy film directed by Camillo Mastrocinque and starring Walter Chiari, Paola Quattrini and Aldo Giuffrè.

Cast

References

Bibliography 
 Peter Cowie. World Filmography 1968. Tantivy Press, 1968.

External links 
 

1968 films
Italian musical comedy films
1968 musical comedy films
1960s Italian-language films
Films directed by Camillo Mastrocinque
Titanus films
1960s Italian films
Musicarelli